The Latin Rite Catholic Diocese of Avellaneda-Lanús (erected 10 April 1961, as the Diocese of Avellaneda) is in Argentina and is a suffragan of the Archdiocese of Buenos Aires. It was renamed on 24 April 2001.

Bishops

Ordinaries
Emilio Antonio di Pasquo (1961–1962)
Jerónimo José Podestá (1962–1967)
Antonio Quarracino (1968–1985), appointed Archbishop of La Plata; future Cardinal
Rubén Héctor di Monte (1986–2000), appointed Archbishop of Mercedes-Luján
Rubén Oscar Frassia (2000–2020)
Marcelo Julián Margni (2021–present)

Auxiliary bishop
Rubén Héctor di Monte (1980-1986), appointed Bishop here

Territorial losses

See also
 List of the Catholic dioceses of Argentina

External links and references

Avellaneda-Lanus
Avellaneda-Lanus
Avellaneda-Lanus
Avellaneda
Lanús
Avellaneda-Lanus
1961 establishments in Argentina